The 2019 National Invitational Softball Championship (NISC) began on May 16, 2019 and concluded on May 26.

Tournament play and team selection

The NISC tournament is designed to feature forty-eight teams in eight six-team regional tournaments with the regional champions advancing to a National Finals tournament. The regionals and the Finals are double-elimination competitions.

For the inaugural tournament, only fifteen of the thirty-two NCAA conferences sent an automatic qualifier (AQ). Seven schools having non-losing records and RPIs in the top 100 entered the tournament with "National RPI" bids. Four other teams with non-losing records against challenging schedules were added as "At-large" teams. The twenty-six teams were placed in six regional tournaments of four or five teams. The six regional champions advanced to the national finals at Liberty University, a site that was determined after the regional competitions.

Participants

Regionals
Sources:

Nevada Regional

Stephan F. Austin Regional

Iowa State Regional

Liberty Regional

Regional Standings
Source: 

The six regional tournaments were played May 16–18, 2019.

The regional and finals competitions were double-elimination tournaments.

Championship Bracket

Participants

Bracket
The third annual National Invitational Softball Championship finals were played May 24–26, 2018 at TC Colorado Field in Fort Collins, Colorado. Teams were seeded by their RPIs.

Championship Game

References

2019 NCAA Division I softball season